Emma Jacqueline Brünjes (born October 1981) is a theater producer and general manager. Brünjes founded and runs the live entertainment firm ebp and is a producer of the Edinburgh Comedy Awards.

Career 
Brünjes started acting as a student at Windlesham School in Brighton, with her first performance playing the Red Queen in her school's production of Alice in Wonderland. While a student at the London School of Economics, Brünjes worked as a waitress at Henry's in Covent Garden, then as an usher at the Royal Opera House.

Brünjes started at Avalon Management as a junior marketing assistant, working alongside Frank Skinner, Harry Hill and Al Murray. At the age of 25, she was made head of promotions at the company. Whilst at Avalon, Brünjes also held a part-time position as a producer for Old Vic New Voices. Brünjes went on to spend three years working with producer Nica Burns at Nimax Theatres. Brünjes served as Nimax's general manager of productions and programming.

Brünjes founded ebp in 2013 which she now jointly runs with brother Ralph.

Brünjes' credits include Dead Funny, Olivier Award nominated Alice’s Adventures Underground, The Twits, and Freddie Flintoff’s 2nd Innings Tour. Brünjes also produced The Game's Afoot at Madame Tussaud's. She has worked on touring productions in the United Kingdom and the Edinburgh Comedy Awards. In 2015, Brünjes produced a show featuring her father, Henry Otto Brünjes at the Edinburgh Fringe Festival. It was called Dial Medicine for Murder and told the story of Harold Shipman and John Bodkin Adams.

Awards
Brünjes won the Old Vic New Voices new production award for Artefacts in 2006, won the Stage One Bursary award in 2007, and was nominated for an Olivier Award in 2016. She was listed in the Stage 100 list in 2017, she has not since been included.

Education
Emma Jacqueline Brünjes is a graduate of the London School of Economics where she studied government and history.

References 

British theatre people
Living people
1981 births